Englerodendron obanense is a small tree in the family Fabaceae. It is endemic to Nigeria. It is threatened by habitat loss.

References

obanense
Flora of Nigeria
Trees of Africa
Vulnerable plants